The Rychtal Region, known in German as Reichthaler Ländchen is the north-eastern part of the former Silesian district of Namslau located around the town of Rychtal (Reichthal), which was ceded by Germany to Poland after World War I.

Settlements 
The following towns and villages belonged to the Reichthaler Ländchen:

 Rychtal                                   (Reichthal)
 Drożki                                (Droschkau)
 Darnowiec                             (Dörnberg)
 Wielki Buczek (Groß Butschkau)
 Krzyżowniki     (Kreuzendorf)
 Hanowry                                   (Marienhof)
 Skoroszów         (Skorischau)
 Zgorzelec         (Skorsellitz)
 Sadogóra                              (Schadegur)
 Stogniewice                           (Herzberg)
 Proszów             (Proschau)

History 
The region was part of Regierungsbezirk Breslau in the Prussian Province of Silesia, in the German Empire until the end of World War I. After the war, the newly restored Polish state claimed the districts of Namslau and Oppeln. In the Treaty of Versailles, Poland was given the eastern part of the Namslau district.

As part of the Upper Silesia plebiscite, a referendum took place in the Namslau voting area. The voting area comprised the south-eastern part of the Namslau district, and included the communities of Bachwitz (Polish: Wieloleka), Dammer, Erbenfeld, Erdmannsdorf, Friedrichsberg, Hennersdorf, Johannesdorf, Noldau, Ordenstal, Sophiental, Steinersdorf, Sterzendorf and Wallendorf. Around 97.6% of votes were in favor of this area remaining with Germany. The border was set with this result in mind.

The Reichthaler Ländchen with 11 towns, about 85 km2 and about 4,600 inhabitants was attached to Poland in 1921 without a referendum. A privately organized survey of the population resulted in a clear vote in favor of remaining with Germany. In the absence of international monitoring, this opinion poll did not meet the requirements of a plebiscite and was not taken into account when drawing the boundary.

The region became part of Germany from 1939 to 1945 during World War II. After the war, it was restored to Poland and is now part of the Kępno County in the Greater Poland Voivodeship.

References 

Silesia
Regions of Poland